Intercultural dialogue (ICD) "occurs when members of different cultural groups, who hold conflicting opinions and assumptions, speak to one another in acknowledgment of those differences". It builds upon the concept of dialogue, which refers to at least two people holding a conversation. And it builds upon the term intercultural, which is typically used to refer to people communicating across differences in nationality, race and ethnicity, or religion. Dialogue has several meanings: it sometimes refers to dialogue in a script, which simply means people talking, but more often it refers to "a quality of communication characterized by the participants' willingness and ability simultaneously to be radically open to the other(s) and to articulate their own views. ... Dialogue's primary goal is understanding rather than agreement."

Description 
The term intercultural dialogue similarly is used with quite different meanings. It may be used broadly, to mean any interaction between people that have different cultural backgrounds, which is the same as what is more often called intercultural communication. More narrowly, it may be used only to refer to a subset of intercultural interactions, those with "a deliberate verbal exchange of views designed to achieve understanding of cultural others, with the more advanced steps of achieving agreement and cooperation understood to be potential later goals". Peter Praxmarer supplied a concise definition: "intercultural dialogue is the art and science of understanding the Other". The Council of Europe proposed a definition in 2008, for the European Year of Intercultural Dialogue, emphasizing the deliberate nature of intercultural dialogue:

Interfaith dialogue, also called interreligious dialogue, is a form of intercultural dialogue that focuses on conversations between members of different religions. Interfaith dialogues assume that the participants wish to understand other religious viewpoints. It is narrower than intercultural dialogue, because a religion is one possible form of cultural identity.

Intergroup dialogue refers to any time members of groups having different identities talk. It is broader than intercultural dialogue, because cultural identity is one type of possible identity.

Uses 

Politicians and diplomats, especially in Europe, have often used the term intercultural dialogue, assuming that it has the following characteristics:
 increases respect for cultural diversity, human rights, and freedom;
 develops sense of community in multicultural populations;
 promotes tolerance, pluralism, openness, mutual respect;
 improves ways of living together;
 strengthens social cohesion;
 strengthens democratic governance;
 increases peace and harmony in a multicultural world; and
 prevents and/or resolves intergroup conflicts.

These assumptions have not been adequately tested through research, although they seem likely and are frequently mentioned as the results of intercultural dialogue.

Intercultural dialogue has been used as a tool for increasing understanding in contexts where misunderstandings typically occur. For example, the European Agency for Culture was established by EU members to coordinate intercultural dialogue activities, "focussing on the integration of migrants and refugees in societies through the arts and culture". Zofia Wilk-Woś showed how the European Commission "considers intercultural dialogue as one of the main instruments of peace and conflict prevention" and that "making people aware of the cultural diversity as well as the need for intercultural dialogue are the most important issues". Communication scholars Benjamin Broome and Mary Jane Collier have argued for the critical role of intercultural dialogue in peacemaking.

Outside of politics and diplomacy, intercultural dialogue has often been an explicit focus within educational contexts, with the goal being either to foster intercultural dialogue on campus or to promote intercultural dialogue in the surrounding communities. Universities have especially often been assumed to be the obvious places where discussions of and training in intercultural dialogue occur.

Anna-Leena Riitaoja and Fred Dervin posed the following questions as essential when studying interreligious dialogue, and these are also obvious questions for any who want to understand intercultural dialogue:
 Who is going to learn about whom, and whose knowledge is to be learnt?
 Does the other have an opportunity to be seen and heard as a subject or relegated to a subaltern position?
 Are knowledge and understanding about her constructed with her and in her own terms?
 Will a religious 'subaltern' ever be equal to the majority in schools?

Many projects intended to facilitate and encourage intercultural dialogues have used existing spaces, especially museums or libraries, as a focus of activities. An example is The Human Library, a project started by a group in Copenhagen, Denmark. On a specific day in their local library, patrons are able to speak informally with "people on loan", chosen to represent the diversity of the local community, who answer any question asked in a neutral setting. The project was so successful it has been duplicated around the world, and beyond libraries into other contexts (museums, festivals, schools).

Centers 
There are multiple organizations titled Center for Intercultural Dialogue or some variation on that, around the world, each having a different mandate and audience. The Center for Intercultural Dialogue in the USA is sponsored by the Council of Communication Associations, and helps to connect researchers, teachers, and practitioners. The Center for Intercultural Dialogue based in Macedonia emphasizes youth projects. The Center for Intercultural Dialogue and Translation in Egypt translates Arab media publications. The KAICIID Dialogue Centre, formally the King Abdullah bin Abdulaziz International Centre for Interreligious and Intercultural Dialogue, originally based in Vienna, Austria, recently moved to Lisbon, Portugal, is a Saudi Arabian non-profit. The Cuernavaca Center for Intercultural Dialogue on Development is a Christian retreat in Mexico. The Anna Lindh Euro-Mediterranean Foundation for the Dialogue Between Cultures based in Egypt is a network of civil society organizations dedicated to promoting intercultural dialogue in the Mediterranean. And Akdim, Antalya Intercultural Dialogue Center, is a Turkish nonprofit intended to improve cross-cultural awareness.

Conferences 
In July 2009, the National Communication Association Summer Conference on Intercultural Dialogue was held at Maltepe University, in Istanbul, Turkey. Results included the establishment of the Center for Intercultural Dialogue in the US in 2010, a special issue of the Journal of International and Intercultural Communication, and an edited collection of essays, mostly based on presentations at the event.

In April 2011, the first World forum on Intercultural dialogue (Azerbaijan) was held in Baku, Azerbaijan,  with the support not only of the government of Azerbaijan, but also of UNESCO, UN Alliance of Civilizations, Council of Europe, North-South Council of the Council of Europe, and ISESCO. Further World Forums have been held in 2013, 2015, 2017, and 2019, all in Baku, with a focus on connecting participants and their organizations rather than publishing presentations. The term for intercultural dialogue used at these events is Baku Process.

In March 2014, the Roundtable on Intercultural Dialogue in Asia was held at the University of Macau. This event asked whether, and in what ways, intercultural dialogue might be a useful term for discussing intercultural interactions in Asia. 

In November 2014, KAICIID Dialogue Centre hosted a conference in Vienna, Austria of Muslim, Christian and Jewish religious leaders from across the Middle East and around the world to join together in respect for tolerance and diversity, denouncing violence in the name of religion.

Online resources 
The Anna Lindh Euro-Mediterranean Foundation for the Dialogue Between Cultures launched the Intercultural Dialogue Resource Centre in 2020. The goal is to make research, good practices, learning activities, expertise and events on intercultural dialogue in the Euro-Mediterranean accessible to everyone. The Centre contains information on more than 100 curated academic publications and the biographies and contact information for 100 experts. It also offers visitors a selection of journalistic articles, events, learning activities developed especially for civil society and around 30 good practices presenting successful projects addressing a variety of issues relating to intercultural encounters, trends and affairs in the Euro-Mediterranean region.

UNESCO created an E-platform for Intercultural Dialogue in 2018, intended "to promote good practices from all over the world, that enable to build bridges between people from diverse backgrounds in order to create more inclusive societies through mutual understanding and respect for diversity". One major section presents a concept glossary, from intercultural dialogue to cultural identity to intercultural citizenship drawn from Intercultural Competences: A Conceptual and Operational Framework published  in 2013.

The Center for Intercultural Dialogue in the US has a website intended to serve as a clearinghouse, with information on everything from publication opportunities to conferences to collaborative opportunities, readings to podcasts to videotapes, jobs to fellowships to postdocs. Profiles of 250 people interested in intercultural dialogue, and links to over 300 organizations around the world sharing goals have been published on the site. A list of hundreds of publications on the topic of intercultural dialogue is also available. The Center produces a series of online publications: Key Concepts in Intercultural Dialogue, one-page introductions to essential vocabulary (such as KC1: Intercultural Dialogue) which are being translated into nearly three dozen languages; Constructing Intercultural Dialogues, case studies of actual interactions; CID Posters, which present concepts visually; In Dialogue: CID Occasional Papers, for longer discussions; and Intercultural Dialogue Exercises, which provide details for exercises of various lengths for various audiences intended to encourage intercultural dialogue.

UNITWIN / UNESCO Chairs 
UNITWIN is the abbreviation for UNESCO's university twinning and networking system. The program

Within UNITWIN, there are dozens of UNESCO Chairs in intercultural dialogue, under a variety of variations on the name. The First Academic Forum of UNESCO Chairs on Intercultural and Interreligious Dialogue was held in 2015. The Second Academic Forum was held in 2017, and the Third Academic Forum in 2019.

See also
Social dialogue
World Day for Cultural Diversity for Dialogue and Development

Notes

Communication studies
Group processes